Mondt is a surname. Notable people with the surname include:

Bill Mondt (born c. 1931), American football player and coach
Erv Mondt (born 1938), American football coach
Nikolaus Mondt (born 1978), German ice hockey player
Toots Mondt (1894–1976), American professional wrestler and promoter